University Heights is a neighborhood in Central San Diego, California centered on Park Boulevard and Adams Avenue.  University Heights is bounded on the west and north by the edge of the mesa, the southern boundary is Lincoln Avenue, and the eastern boundary is Boundary Street along the western edge of Interstate 805. The area is filled with a number of restaurants, coffee shops, boutiques, and artist studios primarily on Park Boulevard and Adams Avenue. Live entertainment can be found most nights.  Adjacent to Hillcrest, Normal Heights and North Park, additional restaurants, bars, coffee shops, and night clubs are within easy reach.

The neighborhood sits in a central San Diego location with a broad spectrum of housing options, from cottages, apartments and condominiums, to million-dollar homes. Downtown, Balboa Park, San Diego Airport, Mission Valley, San Diego State University (SDSU, or "state"), are only a few minutes away.

History
The area was founded in 1888. The name "University" (both for the neighborhood and nearby University Avenue) derives from a plan, originally proposed during the land boom of the 1880s, to build a branch of the University of Southern California in the area. The plan fell through, and the tract of land intended for the university was later used for the State Normal School (predecessor to San Diego State College). The headquarters of San Diego Unified School District currently occupies the site, near the corner of El Cajon and Park boulevards.

The area's population and facilities grew dramatically in 1915 because of the Panama–California Exposition in nearby Balboa Park in 1915-16. On the far northern edge of this mesa, at the scenic rim of Mission Valley, an ostrich farm and public garden spot was constructed near what is now the corner of Adams Avenue and Park Boulevard. Later a neighborhood of homes called Mission Cliff Gardens was built on the site. The gardens were a popular tourist site. The neighborhood still retains the original garden boundary wall of rounded stones.

University Heights became one of the many San Diego neighborhoods connected by the Class 1 streetcars and an extensive San Diego public transit system that was spurred by the Panama-California Exposition of 1915 and built by John D. Spreckels. Built in part to exclusively serve Mission Cliff Gardens, these streetcars became a fixture of this neighborhood until their retirement in 1939. A trolley barn in the area was used for trolley housing and repairs; the facility was converted into a warehouse for the San Diego Paper Box Company and ultimately demolished in 1980. Developers planned to build a large condominium complex at the site, but residents convinced the city to preserve the land for a park, now Old Trolley Barn Park.

Architecture and historic districts
Shirley Ann Place between Madison Ave. and Monroe Ave., has been designated a historic district by the City of San Diego for its 1920s Spanish Colonial Revival bungalows.

Parks
Trolley Barn Park on Adams Avenue, just east of Park Boulevard, is popular with young families and hosts free concerts on Friday evenings during the summer. Sidewalks around the playground in the park are laid out in a pattern mimicking the local street plan, a design also echoed on the carved stone plaque.

Street sign
In 1994 community development funds were allocated to construct a street overhead sign. In 1995 a contest was held calling for entries from local artists for the street sign design. Kevin Whaley's winning concept design was unveiled at the University Heights Community Association meeting. The design incorporated historical elements from the past and present within the community.

In 1996 the City of San Diego awarded the construction project to Young Electric Sign Company (YESCO). On April 3, 1997 the sign was unveiled and illuminated for the first time during a community celebration. The ribbon was cut by then-Mayor Susan Golding and several dignitaries were on hand. The sign serves today as a local landmark and identity for the University Heights community.

References

External links
 University Heights Community Association
 University Heights Community Development Corporation
 University Heights Historical Society
 University Heights Arts Association
 GayCities San Diego: University Heights Guide to Gay Bars & Clubs in University Heights
  San Diego County Online Parcel Map Book

Neighborhoods in San Diego
Urban communities in San Diego
1888 establishments in California